Thelonious Monk Quintet (with Frank Foster, Art Blakey) is a 10" LP by American jazz pianist and composer Thelonious Monk, performed by the Thelonious Monk Quintet. It was originally released in 1954 as the third of five 10" LP albums by Monk for Prestige (PrLP 180).  Its contents were later re-released in sequence as side 1 of the 12-inch album Monk. It has rarely been re-released in its original format, although it was included in a boxed set by Craft Records in a limited edition in 2017.

Track listing
All compositions by Thelonious Monk, except where noted.

Side A:
 "We See" - 5:16
 "Smoke Gets in Your Eyes" (Otto Harbach, Jerome Kern ) - 4:34
Side B:
 "Locomotive" - 6:23
 "Hackensack" - 5:13

Notes
Recorded at Van Gelder Studio in Hackensack, NJ, on May 11, 1954

Personnel
 Thelonious Monk -  piano
 Ray Copeland - trumpet 
 Frank Foster - tenor saxophone 
 Curly Russell - bass 
 Art Blakey - drums

References

Thelonious Monk albums
1954 albums
Prestige Records albums